This is a list of notable independent record labels based in the United Kingdom.

 

0-9

 3 Beat Records
 4AD

A

 Acid Jazz Records
 Alcopop! Records
 All Saints Records
 Ambush Reality
 Andmoresound
 Angular Recording Corporation
 Argo Records (until 1957; sold to Decca and then PolyGram, now under Universal Music Group (UMG))
 Audio Antihero
 ATP Recordings
 Aztec Records

B

 Barely Breaking Even
 Beggars Banquet Records
 Bella Union
 Best Before Records
 Big Life 
 Big Scary Monsters Recording Company
 Blast First
 Bloody Chamber Music
 Blow Up Records
 Blue Dog Records
 Blue Room Released
 Blue Horizon
 Boy Better Know
 Breakbeat Kaos
 Bronze Records
 Brownswood Recordings
 Butterz

C

 Candid Records
 Celtic Music
 Chemikal Underground
 Cherry Red
 Chrysalis (1968–89; since 2016)
 Circle Records
 Clay Records
 Cooking Vinyl
 Communion Music
 Convivium Records
 Crass Records
 Creation Records (1983-1999)
 Creeping Bent
 Cult

D

 Damaged Goods Records
 Damnably
 Dance to the Radio
 Decca Records (until 1980; sold to PolyGram, now under UMG)
 Deceptive Records
 Deltasonic
 Defected Records
 Dented Records
 Dharma Worldwide
 Dick Bros Record Company
 Different Recordings
 Dimension 
 Dirty Hit
 DJM Records
 Document Records
 Do It Records 
 Domino Recording Company
 Dreamboat Records
 Drowned in Sound

E

 Earache
 The Echo Label 
 E.G. Records
 Él 
 Electric Honey
 Ensign Records
 Erased Tapes Records

 Factory Records
 Falling A Records
 Fanfare Records
 Fantastic Plastic Records
 Fast Product
 Fat Cat Records
 Fellside Records
 Fence Records
 FFRR (Pete Tong-owned until 2011)
 Fierce Panda Records
 Fire Records
 Fledg'ling Records
 Fly Records
 FM Records
 FM-Revolver Records
 Food (until 1994; sold to EMI, folded into Parlophone)
 Fortuna Pop!
 Fresh Records
 Full Time Hobby
 Future Legend Records

G

 Gargleblast Records
 Glass Records
 Go! Discs (until 1996; sold to PolyGram, now under UMG)
 Gondwana Records
 Good Soldier
 Grand Central Records
 Gringo Records
 Gut Records

H

 Hassle Records
 Heaven Records
 Heavenly Recordings
 Heist Or Hit Records
 Holy Roar Records
 Hope Recordings
 Hospital Records
 How Does It Feel to Be Loved?
 Hut Records
 Hyperdub
 Hyperion Records (until 2023; sold to UMG)

I

 Ignition Records
 IHT
 Ill Flava Records
 Imaginary Records
 Incus Records
 Independiente Records
 Infectious Music
 Invisible Hands Music
 Iona Records
 Irregular Records
 Island Records (until 1989; sold to Polygram, now under UMG)

J

 JAD Records
 Junior Aspirin Records
 Jasmine Records
 Jeepster Records
 Jungle Records

K

 Kitchenware Records
 Kscope

L

 LAB Records
 Last Night From Glasgow
 Launchpad Records
 Leader Records
 The Leaf Label
 Lex Records
 Linn 
 Lojinx
 Loose Music
 Lost Map Records
 Low Life Records
 LuckyMe (record label)
 LTM Recordings

M

 Major League Productions (MLP)
 MAM Records
 Market Square Records
 Marrakesh Records
 Marshall 
 Memphis Industries
 Ministry of Sound (until 2016; sold to Sony Music (SME))
 Mo' Wax
 Moshi Moshi
 Mr Bongo Records
 Mukatsuku Records
 Music For Nations
 Mute Records

N

 Naim Edge
 Native Records
 Neat Records
 Network
 Never Fade Records
 Ninja Tune
 No Masters
 Nude
 Nuphonic

O

 Odd Box Records
 Olive Grove Records
 On the Fiddle
 One Little Indian Records
 Or Records
 Oriole Records (until 1965; bought by CBS, became CBS Records, now under SME)
 Outta Sight Records

P

 Peacefrog Records
 Peaceville Records
 Perfecto Records
 Phantasy Sound
 Pickled Egg Records
 Placid Casual
 Platform Records
 Play It Again Sam
 Polydor Records (1954–62; sold to PolyGram's predecessors, now under UMG)
 Postcard Records
 Probe Plus
 Pye Records

R

 Radiant Future Records
 RareNoiseRecords
 Rak Records
 RAM Records
 Real World Records
 Recommended Records
 Red Girl Records
 Regent Records (UK)
 Relentless Records
 Revealed Recordings
 Rise Above Records
 Rephlex Records
 Rhythm King 
 Rob's Records
 Rock Action Records
 Rocket Girl
 Ron Johnson Records
 Rough Trade Records

S

 Safari Records
 Saga Entertainment
 Sanctuary Records
 Sarah Records
 Sain
 Suburban Base
 Setanta Records
 Shinkansen Records
 Silvertone Records
 SimG Records
 Situation Two
 Skam Records
 Skint Records
 Sleep It Off Records
 Smalltown America
 Small Wonder Records
 Smash the House
 Snakes & Ladders Records
 Snapper Music
 Some Bizzare Records
 Song, by Toad Records
 Sonic Vista Music
 Sons Ltd.
 Southern Fried Records
 Southern Records
 Specialist Subject Records
 Spinnin' Records (parent record label of Dharma Worldwide; until 2017; sold to Warner Music Group)
 Standby Records
 Steel Tiger Records
 Stiff Records
 Stolen Recordings
 Street Soul Productions
 The Subway Organization
 Super Records
 Sweat It Out

T

 Tectonic (record label)
 Tempa Records
 Temple Records
 Text
 Third Mind Records
 Tigertrap Records
 Tin Angel Records
 Tiny Dog Records
 TNSrecords
 Too Pure
 Topic Records
 Touch Music
 Transatlantic Records
 Transcend Music
 Transgressive Records
 Trash Aesthetics
 Triumph Records (UK)
 Trepan Records
 Trend Records
 Tru Thoughts
 Trojan Records
 Truck Records
 Trunk Records
 Tumi Music

V

 V2 Records
 Valentine Records
 The Village Thing
 Vinyl Solution
 The Viper Label
 VIP Records
 Virgin Records (until 1992; sold to EMI, now under UMG)
 Visible Noise

W

 Wall of Sound
 Warp Records
 Whirlwind Recordings
 Wichita Recordings
 Willkommen Records
 Wiiija
 Woof Records
 Wrath Records

X

 XL Recordings
 Xtra Mile Recordings

Y

 Young formerly Young Turks from 2006 - April 2021

Z
Zoo Records

See also

 List of record labels
 List of electronic music record labels

References

Lists of record labels
Electronic music record labels
British music-related lists